Ivan Sozanskyi (born March 3, 1994) is a Ukrainian footballer who plays with CSC Mississauga in the Canadian Soccer League.

Playing career 
Sozanskyi began his career in 2011 with FC Skala Stryi in the Ukrainian Second League. After four seasons with Skala he played abroad in the IV liga with GKS Aleksandria Aleksandrów, and Cosmos Jozefow. In 2016, he went overseas to sign with Toronto Atomic FC in the Canadian Soccer League. In his debut season he appeared in three matches, and recorded one goal. In 2017, he played indoor soccer with Ukraine AC in the Arena Premier League.

In 2019, he returned to the Canadian Soccer League to play with CSC Mississauga.

References 

1994 births
Living people
Ukrainian footballers
FC Skala Stryi (2004) players
Toronto Atomic FC players
Canadian Soccer League (1998–present) players
Association football forwards
Ukrainian Second League players
Sportspeople from Lviv Oblast